Girl's Apartment is a 1963 comedy film directed by Michel Deville and starring Mylène Demongeot, Sylva Koscina and Renate Ewert. It was a co-production between France, Italy and West Germany.

It was shot at the Epinay Studios in Paris. The film's sets were designed by the art director 
Henri Schmitt.

Plot
A smuggler befriends an air hostess who believes can help him carry off his latest plan, but also encounters her two female roommates.

Cast
 Mylène Demongeot as Mélanie
 Sylva Koscina as Elena
 Renate Ewert as Lolotte
 Sami Frey as Tibère
 Daniel Ceccaldi as François
 Jean-François Calvé as Christophe

References

Bibliography
 Oscherwitz, Dayna & Higgins, MaryEllen. The A to Z of French Cinema. Scarecrow Press, 2009.

External links
 

1963 films
1963 comedy films
1960s French-language films
French comedy films
Italian comedy films
West German films
German comedy films
French black-and-white films
Films directed by Michel Deville
Films shot at Epinay Studios
1960s French films
1960s Italian films
1960s German films
French-language German films